Bikkulovo (Biqqol) is a rural locality (a selo) and the administrative centre of Bikkulovsky Selsoviet, Bizhbulyaksky District, Bashkortostan, Russia. The population was 231 as of 2010. There are 5 streets.

Geography 
Bikkulovo is located 34 km south of Bizhbulyak (the district's administrative centre) by road. Naberezhny is the nearest rural locality.

References 

Rural localities in Bizhbulyaksky District